Julian Blackmon (born August 24, 1998) is an American football safety for the Indianapolis Colts of the National Football League (NFL). He played college football at Utah.

Early years
Blackmon attended Layton High School in Layton, Utah. He played cornerback and wide receiver in high school. A 3-star recruit, Blackmon committed to Utah to play college football over offers from Idaho, Southern Utah, and Weber State. Blackmon also played basketball in high school.

College career
Blackmon played at Utah from 2016 to 2019. He played his first three years as a cornerback before switching to safety for his senior season. As a sophomore in 2017, he was named the MVP of the 2017 Heart of Dallas Bowl. As a senior in 2019, he was named a first-team All-American by Sports Illustrated and The Athletic. He finished his career starting 39 of 48 games, recording 158 tackles, nine interceptions, 1.5 sacks and two touchdowns.

Professional career

Blackmon was selected by the Indianapolis Colts with their third-round (85th-overall) pick in the 2020 NFL Draft. He was placed on the active/non-football injury list on July 27, 2020. He was activated on August 31, 2020.

In Week 4 against the Chicago Bears, Blackmon recorded his first career interception off a pass thrown by Nick Foles during the 19–11 win.
In Week 6 against the Cincinnati Bengals, Blackmon intercepted a pass thrown by fellow rookie Joe Burrow late in the fourth quarter to secure a 31–27 Colts' win.
In Week 11 against the Green Bay Packers, Blackmon forced a fumble on Packers' wide receiver Marquez Valdes-Scantling which was recovered by teammate DeForest Buckner early in overtime to help the Colts win the game 34–31 by a game winning field goal.

During practice for Week 7 of the 2021 season, Blackmon tore his Achilles and was placed on injured reserve on October 23, 2021, ending his season.

References

External links
Utah Utes bio

1998 births
Living people
People from Layton, Utah
Players of American football from Utah
American football cornerbacks
American football safeties
Utah Utes football players
Indianapolis Colts players